OFC Kom is a Bulgarian football club from the town of Berkovitsa, currently playing in the A RFG Montana, the fourth level of Bulgarian football.

The club's home ground is the Mramor Stadium in Berkovitsa, with a capacity of 3,000. Team colours are white, red, black and yellow.

Honours
 Cup of Bulgarian Amateur Football League
 Winners: 2007–08
 Eleventh place in the Western "B" group: 2008/09
 1/8 Finalist in the National Cup Tournament: at that time its official name was Cup of Bulgaria – 2010/11

History
Football Club Kom was founded in 1957. In 1972 the club qualified for Bulgarian second division, but five years later were relegated in amateur division.

In summer 2007 FC Kom merged with another amateur club – FC Minyor 2002 Draganitsa. The new club was named Kom-Minyor and in his first season finished in third position in third division. Thus Kom-Minyor qualified for the Bulgarian second professional division for the second time in his history. In 2007–08 season the club won and the Cup of Amateur Football League. The team have since forfeited their place in the league for the 2010–11 season.

In March 2011, the team decided to cancel its participation in the Bulgarian B Professional Football Group due to financial difficulties and the club was administratively relegated to the amateur divisions. After a few days the club was dissolved.

In 2012 FC Kom was restored.

Last squad 
As of August 31, 2010

External links 
 Kom-Minyor at bgclubs.eu

Kom-Minyor
1957 establishments in Bulgaria
Association football clubs established in 1957
Mining association football clubs in Bulgaria